Cameroonian may refer to:
 Something of, from, or related to the country of Cameroon
 Culture of Cameroon
 Demographics of Cameroon
 Lists of Cameroonians
 Cameroonian Pidgin English
 Languages of Cameroon
 Cameroonian cuisine

See also 
 
 Cameroons or British Cameroon, a former British Mandate territory in British West Africa
 Cameronian, a radical faction of Scottish Covenanters in the 17th and 18th centuries
 Cameronians (disambiguation)

Language and nationality disambiguation pages